The Three-Body Problem is an upcoming science fiction television series based on the novel of the same name by Liu Cixin. The series is set to premiere on Netflix.

Premise
Chinese physicist and nanomaterial researcher Wang Miao gets entangled in a vast conspiracy after state intelligence asks him to infiltrate a group known as The Frontiers of Science, which has been associated with a string of suicides among its members. Ye Wenjie is an astrophysicist, who saw her father brutally murdered during the Chinese Cultural Revolution more than forty years before the main story. After her father's murder, she was taken to a labor camp in Daxing'anling Prefecture but later conscripted because of her scientific background and sent to a secret radar base in a remote region of China. Ye's daughter was one of the suicides Wang must investigate, and they become friends as she recounts her secret work in the base to him. At the same time, Wang progresses through a mysterious VR game called Three Body, which takes place on an alien world with highly irregular weather and day/night cycles. The game follows the attempts of an alien race to build a functional calendar while their society is periodically destroyed by pattern-less waves of extreme heat and extreme cold. The object of the game is for the player to use the scientific method to help the creatures understand the nature of their world.

Cast
 Saamer Usmani
 Jess Hong as Young Ye Wenjie 
 Jovan Adepo
 Sea Shimooka
 Tsai Chin as Ye Wenjie
 Benedict Wong as Shi Qiang
 John Bradley
 Eiza González
 Alex Sharp
 Liam Cunningham
 Marlo Kelly
 Jonathan Pryce  
 Rosalind Chao  
 Ben Schnetzer  
 Eve Ridley

Production
It was announced in September 2020 that David Benioff and D.B. Weiss were developing a television adaptation of the novel at Netflix, with Alexander Woo co-writing alongside them.

In August 2021, Eiza González entered negotiations to join the cast. The same month, Derek Tsang was hired to direct the pilot episode. González would be confirmed by October, with the additional castings including Benedict Wong, Tsai Chin, John Bradley, Liam Cunningham and Jovan Adepo announced. In June 2022, Jonathan Pryce, Rosalind Chao, Ben Schnetzer and Eve Ridley were added to cast.

Production on the series began on November 8, 2021, and will shoot in the United Kingdom and China.

References

External links
 

2020s American drama television series
2020s American science fiction television series
Alien invasions in television
English-language Netflix original programming
Television series created by D. B. Weiss
Television series created by David Benioff
Television shows based on Chinese novels
Television shows filmed in China
Television shows filmed in the United Kingdom
Upcoming drama television series
Upcoming Netflix original programming